Ian Barry is an Australian director of film and TV.

Select credits
Waiting for Lucas (1973) (short)
Stone (1974) (editor only)
The Chain Reaction (1980)
Whose Baby? (1986) (mini-series)
Minnamurra (1989)
Bodysurfer (1989) (mini-series)
Ring of Scorpio (1990) (mini-series)
Crimebroker (1993)
Inferno (1998) (TV movie)
Miss Lettie and Me (2002) (TV movie)
Not Quite Hollywood: The Wild, Untold Story of Ozploitation! (2008) (documentary)
The Doctor Blake Mysteries (2013)

References

External links

Australian film directors
Living people
Year of birth missing (living people)